Daniel Bohnacker (born 21 February 1990) is a German freestyle skier. He was born in Blaubeuren. He competed in ski cross at the World Ski Championships 2013, and at the 2014 Winter Olympics in Sochi, in ski-cross.

References

External links 
 
 
 
 
 

1990 births
Living people
Freestyle skiers at the 2014 Winter Olympics
Freestyle skiers at the 2022 Winter Olympics
German male freestyle skiers
Olympic freestyle skiers of Germany
21st-century German people